Joseph Dolan may refer to:

Joe Dolan (1939–2007), Irish entertainer, recorder and singer of easy listening songs.
"Galway Joe" Dolan (1942–2008), Irish musician, songwriter and artist
Joe Dolan (footballer) (born 1980), English footballer
Joe Dolan (baseball) (1873–1938), American professional baseball player

See also
Dolan (disambiguation)